The 1907–08 season was Stoke's 19th season in the Football League and first in the Second Division.

Stoke now playing in the Second Division failed to mount a promotion challenge and finished in 10th place. However that was the least of Stoke's worries as financial problems dominated the season and ended with the club being put into liquidation and thus had to resign from the Football League. At long last local feeling was roused and attempts were made to raise £2,000 to take over the club, its buildings and remaining assets. Twelve local burghers stepped forward guided by Alfred Barker a former league referee and supporter of the club.

A new board of seven directors was formed and in June 1908 re-branded the club as Stoke Football Club (1908). Barker's impressive efforts led to Stoke being included for re-election but lost out to Tottenham Hotspur and their exit from the Football League was sealed. Barker placed Stoke in the Birmingham & District League for the 1908–09 season.

Season review

League
The 1907–08 season saw Stoke playing in the Second Division for the first time and they started their fixture programme disastrously, collecting just one point from their opening four games. They quickly dropped into the bottom two and although they picked up and eventually finished 10th, their highest spot throughout the campaign but generally it was not a good season. The Victoria Ground faithful witnessed only a few worthwhile performances, the best being a couple of 5–0 victories over Gainsborough Trinity and Grimsby Town and a 6–1 beating of Fulham. Newspaper reports described that win over Fulham as one of the best attacking displays by a Stoke side so far.

FA Cup
Stoke had a good run in the cup soundly beating Lincoln City 5–0, Gainsborough Trinity after three attempts and Portsmouth before losing to eventual winners Wolverhampton Wanderers in front of 31,800.

Football League exit
Finance was now a major problem within the club and following that cup exit to Wolves in February 1908 the fans deserted the team and crowds plummeted alarmingly. Only 2,000 bothered to turn up to see Barnsley beaten 4–0 and the takings at the gate amounted to just £40. It was now common knowledge that the books would not balance as wages repeatedly exceeded the poor gates receipts. Before the end of the season Tom Holford was sold to Manchester City as the directors turned to players to generate income. Only a few players with any real ability stayed with the club as Stoke's squad was sold off. Chairman Cowlishaw's last-ditch efforts to rally support failed and he immediately pulled Stoke out of the league, putting the company into liquidation. Cowlishaw left by stating: "The Potteries public do not deserve a football club if this is the way they show their support".

At long last local feeling was roused and attempts were made to raise £2,000 to take over the club, its buildings and remaining assets. Twelve local burghers stepped forward guided by Alfred Barker a former league referee and supporter of the club. A new board of seven directors was formed and in June 1908 re-branded the club as Stoke Football Club (1908). Barker's impressive efforts led to Stoke being included for re-election but lost out Tottenham Hotspur and their exit from the Football League was confirmed. Barker placed Stoke in the Birmingham & District League for the 1908–09 season.

Final league table

Results
Stoke's score comes first

Legend

Football League Second Division

FA Cup

Squad statistics

References

Stoke City F.C. seasons
Stoke